HMS Otter (S15) was an  submarine of the Royal Navy.

Design and construction

The Oberon class was a direct follow on of the Porpoise-class, with the same dimensions and external design, but updates to equipment and internal fittings, and a higher grade of steel used for fabrication of the pressure hull.

Displacement was 1,610 tons standard, 2,030 tons full load when surfaced, and 2,410 tons full load when submerged. Propulsion machinery consisted of 2 Admiralty Standard Range 16 VMS diesel generators, and two  electric motors, each driving a  3-bladed propeller at up to 400 rpm. Eight  diameter torpedo tubes were fitted (six facing forward, two aft), with a total payload of 24 torpedoes. The boats were fitted with Type 186 and Type 187 sonars, and an I-band surface search radar. The standard complement was 68: 6 officers, 62 sailors.

Otter was laid down by Scotts Shipbuilding and Engineering Company on 14 January 1960, and launched on 15 May 1961. The boat was commissioned into the Royal Navy on 20 August 1962. The only Oberon class submarine fitted with a mild steel casing needed when deployed as target for practice torpedo  attacks.

Operational history

Decommissioning and fate
Otter was paid off on 31 July 1991.

References

Oberon-class submarines of the Royal Navy
Ships built on the River Clyde
1961 ships
Cold War submarines of the United Kingdom